James Gilchrist Swan (January 11, 1818 – May 18, 1900) was an American Indian agent in what is now the U.S. state of Washington, who was known as an authority on the indigenous peoples of the Pacific Northwest Coast, an Indian artifact collector on behalf of the Smithsonian Institution, and for writing the first ethnography of the Makah tribal group, among whom he lived. 

A curious and creative man, his imaginative ambitions included a fantasy of making paper from Puget Sound seaweed.

Sources

 Doig, Ivan (1980) Winter Brothers: A Season at the Edge of America.  New York: Harcourt Brace Jovanovich.
 McDonald, Lucile (1972) Swan among the Indians: Life of James G. Swan, 1818–1900.  Portland, Oregon: Binfords and Mort.

References

Writings

External links
"Swan, James G. (1818–1900)". By Kit Oldham. HistoryLink.org. January 9, 2003.
 
"James Gilchrist Swan", University of Washington Libraries

1818 births
1900 deaths